Wangyuehu Subdistrict is a subdistrict of Yuelu District in Changsha, Hunan, China. The subdistrict has six communities under its jurisdiction.

History
The subdistrict was part of Yuewen Township in 1949. The subdistrict of Yingwanlu was established in 1956 and it was renamed to the present name in 1988.

The two communities of Zhongnan and Xingling were enclaves of Yuelu District located in Gaotangling of Wangcheng District, which were under jurisdiction of Wangyuehu Subdistrict. On December 6, 2017, the two communities were transferred to Gaotangling Subdistrict of Wangcheng District from Yuelu District.

Geography
The subdistrict of Wangyuehu is located to the south of the Longwanggang River, east of Wanqiao Road, north of Juzizhou Bridge and Fenglin Road, adjacent to the Xiang River. It is bordered by Yinpenling to the north, Xihu to the west and Juzizhou to the south.

Subdivisions
6 communities
 Hudong Community
 Huzhong Community
 Ronghua Community
 Ronglong Community
 Yingwanzhen Community
 Yuelong Community

References

External links
 Official Website （Chinese / 中文）

Yuelu District
Subdistricts of Changsha